Svein Hammerø (born 10 November 1947) is a Norwegian footballer. He played in one match for the Norway national football team in 1972.

References

External links
 

1947 births
Living people
Norwegian footballers
Norway international footballers
Place of birth missing (living people)
Association footballers not categorized by position